"Man in the Mirror" is the twenty-second episode of the second series of the 1960s cult British spy-fi television series The Avengers, starring Patrick Macnee and Julie Stevens. It was first broadcast in the Teledu Cymru region of the ITV network on Friday 22 February 1963. ABC Weekend TV, who produced the show for ITV, broadcast it the next day in its own regions. The episode was directed by Kim Mills and written by Geoffrey Orme and Anthony Terpiloff.

Plot
A cipher expert commits suicide at an amusement park, however Venus Smith discovers that she has taken a photograph of the man several days later, apparently very much alive. Steed investigates the mystery.

Music
Julie Stevens sings There's Nothin' Like Love from the film My Sister Eileen and ''I Know Where I'm Going from I Know Where I'm Going!

Cast
 Patrick Macnee as John Steed
 Julie Stevens as Venus Smith
 Daphne Anderson as Betty Brown
 Ray Barrett as Strong
 Julian Somers as Mike Brown
 Rhoda Lewis as Jean Trevelyan
 Hayden Jones as Victor Trevelyan 
 Michael Gover as One Six
 David Graham as Peter the Producer
 Freda Knorr as Iris

References

External links

Episode overview on The Avengers Forever! website

The Avengers (season 2) episodes
1963 British television episodes